Eliseo Antonio Quintanilla Ortíz (born 5 February 1983) is a former Salvadoran professional footballer.

Club career
Nicknamed Cheyo, Quintanilla started his professional career at Salvadorian giants FAS, making his professional debut in 1999 at age 16. In 2001, he moved to rivals Águila and while with them, he played in a friendly in Los Angeles.

Major League Soccer
The management at Major League Soccer outfit D.C. United watched the game tapes and signed the small playmaker with the club in 2002. Injuries however curtailed his MLS career. He scored just five goals and five assists in two years in the league, missing all of 2004 with an injury, and was subsequently released. In 2004, he was injured at a preseason training camp and was unable to play the entire season.

He returned to play in his native country but in 2008, Quintanilla signed a five-month deal with Costa Rican football club L.D. Alajuelense. After being released he again returned to El Salvador, where he rejoined Águila for two years.

Europe
In May 2009, Quintanilla signed to newly promoted Cypriot team Ermis Aradippou for the 2009/2010 season. His stay was somewhat short-lived, only playing 10 domestic league games and scoring one goal in the Cypriot Cup.

On 16 December 2009, it was confirmed by Mexican lower league side Correcaminos UAT that they had acquired Quintanilla on a six-month contract. Shortly after Correcaminos were eliminated in the quarter-finals, it was announced that Quintanilla would no longer continue with the club. Quintanilla made 17 league appearances and only scored one goal for the club.

In May 2010, Quintanilla signed a one-year contract with Luis Ángel Firpo and on 24 May 2011, Quintanilla signed with Guatemalan club Municipal. Quintanilla scored an amazing goal from a free kick on 1 December 2011 against Marquense. The goal won the prize called "Premios Matador" on ESPN Deportes. He received 96%, from the 10 players voting, which broke the voting record for "Premios Matador".

Match-fixing ban
On September 20, 2013, Quintanilla was banned for 6 months due to his involvement with match fixing.

International career
Quintanilla made his debut for El Salvador, aged 16 years, in a February 2000 friendly match against Honduras and has, as of December 2011, earned a total of 59 caps, scoring 15 goals. He has represented his country in 19 FIFA World Cup qualification matches and played at the 2007 and 2009 UNCAF Nations Cups, as well as at the 2007, 2009 and 2011 CONCACAF Gold Cups.

On 22 June 2008, Eliseo scored two goals as El Salvador came back in a thriller to defeat Panama, 3–1. With the win, El Salvador advanced to Round 3 in the CONCACAF Zone in the World Cup Qualifiers for Africa 2010.

On 28 March 2009, Quintanilla scored his twelfth, and quite possibly most memorable goal with the national team. The goal came in a World Cup qualification match against the USA and marked the first time in over eleven years that El Salvador had managed to score a goal against them. The match ultimately ended in a 2 all draw.

International goals

|-
| 1. || 24 January 2007 || Estadio Cuscatlán, San Salvador, El Salvador ||  || 1–0 || 1–0 || Friendly
|-
| 2. ||  8 February 2007 || Estadio Cuscatlán, San Salvador, El Salvador ||  || 2–0 || 2–1 || 2007 UNCAF Nations Cup
|-
| 3. || 10 February 2007 || Estadio Cuscatlán, San Salvador, El Salvador ||  || 1–0 || 2–1 || 2007 UNCAF Nations Cup
|-
| 4. || 10 February 2007 || Estadio Cuscatlán, San Salvador, El Salvador ||  || 2–1 || 2–1 || 2007 UNCAF Nations Cup
|-
| 5. || 8 September 2007 || Estadio Olímpico Atahualpa, Quito, Ecuador ||  || 1–2 || 1–5 || Friendly
|-
| 6. || 13 October 2007 || Estadio Cuscatlán, San Salvador, El Salvador ||  || 1–2 || 2–2 || Friendly
|-
| 7. || 6 February 2008 || Estadio Cuscatlán, San Salvador, El Salvador ||  || 9–0 || 12–0 || 2010 FIFA World Cup qualification
|-
| 8. || 22 June 2008 || Estadio Cuscatlán, San Salvador, El Salvador ||  || 1–1 || 3–1 || 2010 FIFA World Cup qualification
|-
| 9. || 22 June 2008 || Estadio Cuscatlán, San Salvador, El Salvador ||  || 2–1 || 3–1 || 2010 FIFA World Cup qualification
|-
| 10. || 15 October 2008 || Estadio Cuscatlán, San Salvador, El Salvador ||  || 2–0 || 3–0 || 2010 FIFA World Cup qualification
|-
| 11. || 22 October 2008 || Robert F. Kennedy Stadium, Washington, D.C., United States ||  || 1–0 || 2–0 || Friendly
|-
| 12. || 28 March 2009 || Estadio Cuscatlán, San Salvador, El Salvador ||  || 1–0 || 2–2 || 2010 FIFA World Cup qualification
|-
| 13. || 6 June 2009 || Estadio Cuscatlán, San Salvador, El Salvador ||  || 2–1 || 2–1 || 2010 FIFA World Cup qualification
|-
| 14. || 3 March 2010 || Los Angeles Coliseum, Los Angeles, United States ||  || 2–1 || 2–1 || Friendly
|-
| 15. || 12 June 2011 || Soldier Field, Chicago, United States ||  || 6–1 || 6–1 || 2011 CONCACAF Gold Cup
|}

Overall international

Honours

Club honours
 Municipal
Liga Nacional de Fútbol de Guatemala (1): 2011 Apertura
 Metapan
Salvadoran Primera División (1): Apertura 2012

References

External links
 
 
 El Grafico Profile 
 
 

1983 births
Living people
People from La Libertad Department (El Salvador)
Association football midfielders
Salvadoran footballers
El Salvador international footballers
2007 UNCAF Nations Cup players
2007 CONCACAF Gold Cup players
2009 UNCAF Nations Cup players
2009 CONCACAF Gold Cup players
2011 CONCACAF Gold Cup players
C.D. FAS footballers
C.D. Águila footballers
D.C. United players
Alianza F.C. footballers
San Salvador F.C. footballers
L.D. Alajuelense footballers
Ermis Aradippou FC players
Correcaminos UAT footballers
C.D. Luis Ángel Firpo footballers
C.S.D. Municipal players
Liga FPD players
Cypriot First Division players
Salvadoran expatriate footballers
Expatriate soccer players in the United States
Expatriate footballers in Costa Rica
Expatriate footballers in Cyprus
Expatriate footballers in Mexico
Expatriate footballers in Guatemala
Major League Soccer players
Sportspeople involved in betting scandals